Minnesota is home to many ski resorts.

List of ski resorts

Minnesota

 Afton Alps - Afton
 Andes Tower Hills - Kensington
 Buck Hill - Burnsville
 Buena Vista - Bemidji
 Coffee Mill Ski Area  - Wabasha
 Detroit Mountain - Detroit Lakes
 Elm Creek - Maple Grove
 Giants Ridge - Biwabik
 Hyland Ski and Snowboard Area - Bloomington
 Lutsen Mountains - Lutsen Township
 Mt. Itasca - Coleraine, Minnesota
 Mount Kato - Mankato
 Powder Ridge - Kimball
 Ski Gull - Nisswa
 Spirit Mountain - Duluth
 Steeplechase Ski and Snowboard Area - Mazeppa (no longer in operation)
 Welch Village - Welch
 Wild Mountain - Taylors Falls

References
MN Slopes
Minnesota Ski Areas Assoc
Guide to Skiing in Minnesota (1974) MN Publicity and Promotion Division

See also
List of ski areas and resorts in the United States

Ski areas
Minnesota
 
Ski areas